The Shire of Goomalling is a local government area in the Wheatbelt region of Western Australia, about  northeast of Perth, the state capital.

History
On 18 January 1895, the Goomalling Road District was created. On 1 July 1961, it became a Shire following the enactment of the Local Government Act 1960.

Wards
The shire has been divided into 4 wards:

 Town Ward (4 councillors)
 North Ward (2 councillors)
 South Ward (2 councillors)
 Central Ward (1 councillor)

Towns and localities
The towns and localities of the Shire of Goomalling with population and size figures based on the most recent Australian census:

Population

Heritage-listed places
As of 2023, 38 places are heritage-listed in the Shire of Goomalling, of which two are on the State Register of Heritage Places.

References

External links
 

Goomalling